Qarah Kahriz (also Romanized as Qarah Kahrīz and Qareh Kahrīz; also known as Ghareh Kahriz and Qara Kārīz) is a village in Zarrineh Rud Rural District, Bizineh Rud District, Khodabandeh County, Zanjan Province, Iran. At the 2006 census, its population was 617, in 114 families.

References 

Populated places in Khodabandeh County